Ryan Johnson (born 26 November 1984) is a Jamaican former professional footballer who played as a forward.

Career

Youth and college
Johnson was born in Kingston, Jamaica and moved to the Boston area with his family while he was still an infant. He played high school soccer and basketball at Melrose High School in Massachusetts, where he was a Middlesex League and Eastern Mass League soccer all-star. He attended Oregon State University on a sports scholarship and played college soccer there from 2002 to 2005, where he scored 18 goals and assisted on 30 while appearing in 76 matches. He also spent two seasons in the USL Premier Development League, playing for Cape Cod Crusaders and Boulder Rapids Reserve.

Professional
Johnson was drafted in the third round, 26th overall, by Real Salt Lake in the 2006 MLS SuperDraft. On 25 July 2006, after only appearing in 7 matches with Salt Lake, Johnson was traded to Chicago Fire in exchange for Jack Stewart. In the remainder of the 2006 season, Johnson played 3 matches for the Fire and failed to agree on a new contract with the team at season's end.

In early 2007, he was on trial with various teams in Scandinavia and eventually got a short-term contract with Swedish side Östers IF (then at Superettan), that stretched from March 2007 to July 2007. Because Östers' had a surplus of centre forwards at the time, they chose not to extend his contract any further and instead loaned Anatolij Ponomarev from GAIS. In 2007, he was on trial in FK Bodø/Glimt where he played one game against Leknes FK. He scored the last goal in the 8–1 win.

After a short stint playing indoor soccer with the New Jersey Ironmen, Johnson signed with San Jose Earthquakes for the 2008 MLS season. At the end of the 2009 MLS season, Johnson was named team MVP as the team's leading goalscorer.

On 14 July 2011, San Jose traded Johnson, an international roster spot, and allocation money to Toronto FC for Nana Attakora, Alan Gordon and Jacob Peterson. On 20 July Johnson made his debut for Toronto in a 1–0 home loss to FC Dallas. Three days later against Sporting Kansas City Johnson scored his first goal of the season for Toronto and assisted on a goal by newly acquired Danny Koevermans. The game ended as a 4–2 away defeat. On 2 August, in the return leg of the preliminary round of the CONCACAF Champions League, Johnson scored a superb volley in the 37th minute, followed by a goal in the 47th from a misplaced pass by the Real Esteli F.C. keeper. The two goals put Toronto FC into the group stage for the second straight year on an aggregate of 4–2.

Johnson continued his goal scoring form at the beginning of the 2012 season after scoring in both legs of the Champions League Quarter finals against Los Angeles Galaxy and against Seattle Sounders FC on 17 March. Johnson's goal against the Sounders earned him goal of the week. Johnson was awarded the George Gross Memorial Trophy as the 2012 Canadian Championship's best player.

Johnson was traded with Miloš Kocić to Portland Timbers on 12 December 2012 in exchange for Joe Bendik, a first-round pick in the 2013 MLS SuperDraft, and allocation money.

On 27 February 2014, Johnson transferred to Chinese Super League newcomer Henan Jianye.

The start of the 2015 season saw Ryan join new Korean K-League side Seoul E-Land FC under the tutelage of former Vancouver Whitecaps FC manager Martin Rennie and his assistant, ex-West Bromwich Albion and Celtic FC's Dan Harris.

In March 2016, Johnson signed for North American Soccer League side Rayo OKC. Johnson was released by Rayo OKC on 26 May 2016.

International
Johnson made his debut with the Jamaica national football team on 12 April 2006 in a friendly against the United States, playing the first 70 minutes. He was rewarded for his outstanding 2009 MLS season with a recall to the Jamaica national football team in January 2010 for a friendly match versus Canada and a February 2010 match versus Argentina. He scored his first national team goal in a 2–1 loss to Argentina in Mar del Plata on 10 February 2010. Johnson continued his strong performances with the national team by scoring the winning goal versus Costa Rica in September 2010.

International goals

Honours

Club
Toronto FC
 Canadian Championship (1): 2012

Individual
 George Gross Memorial Trophy: 2012

References

External links

 
 
 

1984 births
Living people
Colorado Rapids U-23 players
Cape Cod Crusaders players
Chicago Fire FC players
Expatriate footballers in Sweden
Association football midfielders
Association football forwards
Jamaican expatriate footballers
Jamaica international footballers
2011 CONCACAF Gold Cup players
Expatriate soccer players in the United States
Expatriate soccer players in Canada
Jamaican footballers
Major League Soccer players
New Jersey Ironmen (MISL) players
Oregon State Beavers men's soccer players
Östers IF players
Sportspeople from Kingston, Jamaica
Portland Timbers players
Real Salt Lake draft picks
Real Salt Lake players
San Jose Earthquakes players
Toronto FC players
USL League Two players
Chinese Super League players
Expatriate footballers in China
Henan Songshan Longmen F.C. players
Seoul E-Land FC players
K League 2 players
Expatriate footballers in South Korea
Jamaican expatriate sportspeople in South Korea
Soccer players from Massachusetts
Rayo OKC players
North American Soccer League players